Talostolida is a genus of sea snails, marine gastropod mollusks in the subfamily Erroneinae of the family Cypraeidae, the cowries.

Species
Species within the genus Talostolida include:
Talostolida latior (Melvill, 1888)
Talostolida pellucens (Melvill, 1888)
Talostolida subteres (Weinkauff, 1881)
Talostolida teres (Gmelin, 1791)
 Talostolida violacincta (Lorenz, 2002)
Species brought into synonymy
 Talostolida natalensis (Heiman & Mienis, 2002): synonym of Talostolida pellucens pellucens (Melvill, 1888)
 Talostolida pseudoteres Lorenz & Barbier, 1992  synonym of Ovatipsa pseudoteres (Lorenz & Barbier, 1992)
 Talostolida rashleighana (Melvill, 1888): synonym of Ovatipsa rashleighana (Melvill, 1888)

References

 Schilder, M. and Schilder, F. A. 1971. A Catalogue of Living and Fossil Cowries. Taxonomy and Bibliography of Triviacea and Cypraeacea (Gastropoda Prosobranchia). Institut Royal des Sciences naturelles de Belgique, Mémoires, Deuxième Série, Fasc. 85: 246 pp. page(s): 54
 Lorenz, F. (2017). Cowries. A guide to the gastropod family Cypraeidae. Volume 1, Biology and systematics. Harxheim: ConchBooks. 644 pp

External links
 Iredale, T. (1931). Australian molluscan notes. Nº I. Records of the Australian Museum. 18(4): 201-235

Cypraeidae
Articles containing video clips